ISO 128 is an international standard (ISO), about the general principles of presentation in technical drawings, specifically the graphical representation of objects on technical drawings.

Overview 
Since 2003 the ISO 128 standard contains fifteen parts, which were initiated between 1996 and 2003. It starts with a summary of the general rules for the execution and structure of technical drawings. Further it describes basic conventions for lines, views, cuts and sections, and different types of engineering drawings, such as those for mechanical engineering, architecture, civil engineering, and shipbuilding. It is applicable to both manual and computer-based drawings, but it is not applicable to three-dimensional CAD models.

The ISO 128 replaced the previous DIN 6 standard for drawings, projections and views, which was first published in 1922 and updated in 1950 and 1968. ISO 128 itself was first published in 1982, contained 15 pages and "specified the general principles of presentation to be applied to technical drawings following the orthographic projection methods". Several parts of this standard have been updated individually. The last parts and the standard as a whole were withdrawn by the ISO in 2001.

A thirteenth part was added in 2013.

Composition of ISO 128 
The 7 parts of the ISO 128 standard are:
 ISO 128-1:2020 Technical product documentation (TPD) — General principles of representation — Part 1: Introduction and fundamental requirements
 ISO 128-2:2020 Technical product documentation (TPD) — General principles of representation — Part 2: Basic conventions for lines
 ISO 128-3:2022 Technical product documentation (TPD) — General principles of representation — Part 3: Views, sections and cuts
 ISO 128-15:2013 Technical product documentation (TPD) — General principles of presentation — Part 15: Presentation of shipbuilding drawings
 ISO/TS 128-71:2010 Technical product documentation (TPD) — General principles of presentation — Part 71: Simplified representation for mechanical engineering drawings
 ISO 128-100:2020 Technical product documentation — General principles of representation — Part 100: Index

Withdrawn parts
 Replaced by ISO 128-2:2020
 ISO 128-20:1996 Technical drawings — General principles of presentation — Part 20: Basic conventions for lines
 ISO 128-21:1997 Technical drawings — General principles of presentation — Part 21: Preparation of lines by CAD systems
 ISO 128-22:1999 Technical drawings — General principles of presentation — Part 22: Basic conventions and applications for leader lines and reference lines
 ISO 128-23:1999 Technical drawings — General principles of presentation — Part 23: Lines on construction drawings
 ISO 128-24:2014 Technical drawings — General principles of presentation — Part 24: Lines on mechanical engineering drawings
 ISO 128-25:1999 Technical drawings — General principles of presentation — Part 25: Lines on shipbuilding drawings
 Replaced by ISO 128-3:2022
 ISO 128-30:2001 Technical drawings — General principles of presentation — Part 30: Basic conventions for views
 ISO 128-33:2018 Technical product documentation (TPD) — General principles of presentation — Part 33: Representation of views, sections and cuts in construction drawings
 ISO 128-34:2001 Technical drawings — General principles of presentation — Part 34: Views on mechanical engineering drawings
 ISO 128-40:2001 Technical drawings — General principles of presentation — Part 40: Basic conventions for cuts and sections
 ISO 128-43:2015 Technical product documentation (TPD) — General principles of presentation — Part 43: Projection methods in building drawings
 ISO 128-44:2001 Technical drawings — General principles of presentation — Part 44: Sections on mechanical engineering drawings
 ISO 128-50:2001 Technical drawings — General principles of presentation — Part 50: Basic conventions for representing areas on cuts and sections

Other ISO standards related to technical drawing 

 ISO 129 Technical product documentation (TPD) — Presentation of dimensions and tolerances
 ISO 129-1:2018 Technical product documentation (TPD) — Presentation of dimensions and tolerances — Part 1: General principles
 ISO 129-4:2013 Technical product documentation (TPD) — Indication of dimensions and tolerances — Part 4: Dimensioning of shipbuilding drawings
 ISO 129-5:2018 Technical product documentation — Indication of dimensions and tolerances — Part 5: Dimensioning of structural metal work
 ISO 216 paper sizes, e.g. the A4 paper size
 ISO 406:1987 Technical drawings — Tolerancing of linear and angular dimensions
 ISO 1660:2017 Geometrical product specifications (GPS) — Geometrical tolerancing — Profile tolerancing
 ISO 2203:1973 Technical drawings — Conventional representation of gears
 ISO 3040:2016 Geometrical product specifications (GPS) — Dimensioning and tolerancing — Cones
 ISO 3098-1:1974 Technical Drawing — Lettering — Part I: Currently Used Characters
 ISO 4172:1991 Technical drawings — Construction drawings — Drawings for the assembly of prefabricated structures
 ISO 5261:1995 Technical drawings — Simplified representation of bars and profile sections 
 ISO 5455:1979 Technical drawings — Scales 
 ISO 5456 Technical drawings — Projection methods
 ISO 5456-1:1996 Technical drawings — Projection methods — Part 1: Synopsis
 ISO 5456-2:1996 Technical drawings — Projection methods — Part 2: Orthographic representations 
 ISO 5456-3:1996 Technical drawings — Projection methods — Part 3: Axonometric representations
 ISO 5456-4:1996 Technical drawings — Projection methods — Part 4: Central projection
 ISO 5457:1999 Technical product documentation — Sizes and layout of drawing sheets
 ISO 5459:2011 Geometrical product specifications (GPS) — Geometrical tolerancing — Datums and datum systems
 ISO 5845-1:1995 Technical drawings — Simplified representation of the assembly of parts with fasteners — Part 1: General principles
 ISO 6410-1:1993 Technical drawings — Screw threads and threaded parts — Part 1: General conventions
 ISO 6411:1982 Technical drawings — Simplified representation of centre holes 
 ISO 6412-1:2017 Technical product documentation — Simplified representation of pipelines — Part 1: General rules and orthogonal representation
 ISO 6413:2018 Technical product documentation — Representation of splines and serrations 
 ISO 6414:2020 Technical product documentation (TPD) — Technical drawings for glassware
 ISO 6428:1982 Technical drawings — Requirements for microcopying 
 ISO 6433:2012 Technical drawings — Part references
 ISO 7083:1983 Technical drawings — Symbols for geometrical tolerancing — Proportions and dimensions
 ISO 7200:2004 Technical product documentation — Data fields in title blocks and document headers
 ISO 7437:1990 Technical drawings — Construction drawings — General rules for execution of production drawings for prefabricated structural components
 ISO 7518:1983 Technical drawings — Construction drawings — Simplified representation of demolition and rebuilding
 ISO 7519:1991 Technical drawings — Construction drawings — General principles of presentation for general arrangement and assembly drawings
 ISO 8015:2011 Geometrical product specifications (GPS) — Fundamentals — Concepts, principles and rules
 ISO 8048:1984 Technical drawings — Construction drawings — Representation of views, sections and cuts 
 ISO 8560:2019 Technical drawings — Construction drawings — Representation of modular sizes, lines and grids
 ISO 8826-1:1989 Technical drawings — Rolling bearings — Part 1: General simplified representation 
 ISO 8826-2:1994 Technical drawings — Rolling bearings — Part 2: Detailed simplified representation
 ISO 9222-1:1989 Technical drawings — Seals for dynamic application — Part 1: General simplified representation 
 ISO 9222-2:1989 Technical drawings — Seals for dynamic application — Part 2: Detailed simplified representation 
 ISO 9958-1:1992 Draughting media for technical drawings — Draughting film with polyester base — Part 1: Requirements and marking
 ISO 9961:1992 Draughting media for technical drawings — Natural tracing paper
 ISO 10209:2012 Technical product documentation — Vocabulary — Terms relating to technical drawings, product definition and related documentation
 ISO 10579:2010 Geometrical product specifications (GPS) — Dimensioning and tolerancing — Non-rigid parts
 ISO 13567 is an international Computer-aided design (CAD) layer standard.
 ISO 13715:2017 Technical product documentation — Edges of undefined shape — Indication and dimensioning 
 ISO 15786:2008 Technical drawings — Simplified representation and dimensioning of holes

See also 
 List of ISO standards
 CAD standards
 ISO 216 paper sizes, e.g. the A4 paper size
 ISO 13567 is an international Computer-aided design (CAD) layer standard.
 Engineering drawing

References 

00128
Technical drawing